No wave is a music and art genre, named for the transient avant-garde music and visual art scene from which it emerged in the late 1970s in downtown New York City.

The musical term No Wave was a pun based on the rejection of commercial new wave music. Reacting against punk rock's recycling of rock and roll clichés, no wave musicians instead experimented with noise, dissonance and atonality in addition to non-rock genres like free jazz and disco while often reflecting an abrasive, confrontational, and nihilistic worldview.

In 1978, Rhys Chatham curated a concert at The Kitchen with two electric guitar noise music bands that involved Glenn Branca (Theoretical Girls and Daily Life, performed by Branca, Barbara Ess, Paul McMahon and Christine Hahn) and another two electric guitar noise music bands that involved Chatham himself (The Gynecologists and Tone Death, performed by Robert Appleton, Nina Canal, Chatham and Peter Gordon). Tone Death performed Chatham's 1977 composition for electric guitars Guitar Trio, that was inspired by La Monte Young's minimalist masterpiece Trio for Strings and Chatham's exposure to The Ramones at CBGB via Peter Gordon. This proto-No Wave concert was followed a few weeks later when Artists Space served as a site of concrete inception for the No Wave music movement, hosting a  five night underground No Wave music festival, organized by artists Michael Zwack and Robert Longo, that featured ten local bands; including Rhys Chatham's The Gynecologists, Communists, Glenn Branca's Theoretical Girls, Terminal, Rhys Chatham's Tone Death. and Branca's Daily Life. The final two days of the show featured DNA and the Contortions on Friday, followed by Mars and Teenage Jesus and the Jerks on Saturday. English musician and producer Brian Eno, who had originally come to New York to produce the second Talking Heads album More Songs About Buildings and Food, was in the audience. Impressed by what he saw and heard, and advised by Diego Cortez to do so, Eno was convinced that this movement should be documented and proposed the idea of a compilation album, No New York, with himself as a producer.

The movement was short-lived but highly influential in the music world. Aside from the music genre, the no wave movement also had a significant influence in independent film (no wave cinema), fashion, and visual art.

Overview/characteristics

No wave is not a clearly definable musical genre with consistent features, but it generally was characterized by a rejection of the recycling of traditional rock aesthetics, such as blues rock styles and Chuck Berry guitar riffs in punk and new wave music. Various groups, such as Youth in Asia and The Gynecologists, drew on and explored such disparate stylistic forms as minimalism, conceptual art, funk, jazz, blues, punk rock, and avant garde noise music. According to Village Voice writer Steve Anderson, the scene pursued an abrasive reductionism which "undermined the power and mystique of a rock vanguard by depriving it of a tradition to react against". Anderson claimed that the no wave scene represented "New York's last stylistically cohesive avant-rock movement".

There were, however, some elements common to most no-wave music, such as abrasive atonal sounds; repetitive, driving rhythms; and a tendency to emphasize musical texture over melody—typical of La Monte Young's early downtown music. In the early 1980s, Downtown Manhattan's no wave scene transitioned from its abrasive origins into a more dance-oriented sound, with compilations such as ZE Records's Mutant Disco (1981) highlighting a playful sensibility borne out of the city's clash of hip hop, disco and punk styles, as well as dub reggae and world music influences.

No wave music presented a negative and nihilistic world view that reflected the desolation of late 1970s downtown New York and how they viewed the larger society. In a 2020 essay, Lydia Lunch stated there were many problems in the years that led into the 1970s, and that calling 1967 the Summer of Love was a bold-faced lie. The term "no wave" might have been inspired by the French New Wave pioneer Claude Chabrol, with his remark "There are no waves, only the ocean".

Etymology
There are different theories about how the term was coined. Some suggest Lydia Lunch coined the term in an interview with Roy Trakin in New York Rocker. Others suggest it was coined by Chris Nelson (of Mofungo and The Scene Is Now) in New York Rocker. Thurston Moore of Sonic Youth claimed to have seen the term spray-painted on CBGB's Second Avenue Theater at 66 Second Avenue before seeing it in the press.

Early forerunners

Nihilist Spasm Band were an early noise music/noise rock band from the 1960s. Their debut record No Record, released in 1968, has been described as being a '60s precursor to no wave, with its nihilistic world view and complete disregard for any sort of musical structure, as evinced by the freely improvised noise of songs such as "Destroy The Nations" and "Dog Face Man". The band plastered the word "NO" on much of their equipment and handmade instruments, and recorded a film between 1965 and 1966 entitled "NO Movie". Member Bill Exley would sometimes wear a monkey mask on stage to conceal his identity. They've been cited as an influence by Thurston Moore of Sonic Youth.

The Velvet Underground, a 1960s New York City band, are also seen as early contributors to the no wave movement. As described by Pitchfork's Marc Masters: "Mixing the noisy rock leanings of Lou Reed, the minimalist  drones of John Cale (via his work with avant-garde pioneer LaMonte Young), and the art world influence of Andy Warhol's Factory, this seminal band provided a comprehensive model for No Wave."

The Godz were a New York City-based psychedelic noise band connected to ESP-Disk. John Dougan opined in AllMusic: " the three squalling bits of avant-garde noise/junk they recorded from 1966-1968. Sounding like a prototype for Half Japanese or the Shaggs.."

Red Krayola are an experimental rock band that formed in 1966, they have been assessed as "helping sow the seeds of punk and no wave."

Cromagnon were a 1960s New York City band whose sole album Orgasm was cited by AllMusic's Alex Henderson as foreshadowing no-wave.

Yoko Ono a Japanese multimedia artist who was associated with fluxus and was married to John Lennon of The Beatles at the time, released an album called Yoko Ono/Plastic Ono Band in 1970, the record was later assessed as a precursor to punk, post-punk, new wave and no wave - "It’s a record dense with ideas and sonics; the personal and the political".

Suicide were a New York City band that was formed in 1970 by Alan Vega and Martin Rev, they've been cited by Pitchfork's Marc Masters as having "the biggest influence on no-wave".

Jack Ruby were a New York City band that formed in 1973, they were an early influence on Sonic Youth and Thurston Moore, and are seen as early pioneers of the aesthetic, philosophy, and sound of no wave.

The no-wave music scene
In 1978, a punk subculture-influenced noise series was held at New York's Artists Space. No wave musicians such as the Contortions, Teenage Jesus and the Jerks, Mars, DNA, Theoretical Girls and Rhys Chatham began experimenting with noise, dissonance and atonality in addition to non-rock styles. The former four groups were included on the compilation No New York, often considered the quintessential testament to the scene. The no wave-affiliated label ZE Records was founded in 1978, and would also produce acclaimed and influential compilations in subsequent years.

By the early 1980s, artists such as Liquid Liquid, the B-52's, Cristina, Arthur Russell, James White and the Blacks and Lizzy Mercier Descloux developed a dance-oriented style described by Lucy Sante as "anything at all + disco bottom". Other no-wave groups such as Swans, Suicide, Glenn Branca, the Lounge Lizards, Bush Tetras and Sonic Youth instead continued exploring the forays into noise music abrasive territory. For example, Noise Fest was an influential festival of no wave noise music performances curated by Thurston Moore of Sonic Youth at the New York City art space White Columns in June 1981. Sonic Youth made their first live appearances at this show. It inspired Speed Trials, the noise rock five-night concert series held May 4–8, 1983, that was organized by Live Skull members in May 1983, also at White Columns (then located at 91 Horatio Street). Among an art installation created by David Wojnarowicz and Joseph Nechvatal, Speed Trials included performances by the Fall, Sonic Youth, Lydia Lunch, Mofungo, Ilona Granet, pre-rap Beastie Boys, 3 Teens Kill 4, Elliott Sharp as Carbon, Swans, the Ordinaires, and Arto Lindsay as Toy Killers. On May 10, the San Francisco noise-punk band Flipper closed the series out with a live concert at Studio 54. This event also included performances by Zev and Eric Bogosian and a video presentation by Tony Oursler. Speed Trials was followed by the short-lived after-hours audio art Speed Club that was established by Nechvatal and Bradley Eros at ABC No Rio that summer.

Other art mediums in the no wave scene

Cinema

No wave cinema was an underground film scene in Tribeca and the East Village. Filmmakers included Amos Poe, Eric Mitchell, Charlie Ahearn, Vincent Gallo, James Nares, Jim Jarmusch, Vivienne Dick, Scott B and Beth B and Seth Tillett, and led to the Cinema of Transgression and work by Nick Zedd and Richard Kern.

Visual art
Visual artists played a large role in the no wave scene, as visual artists often were playing in bands, or making videos and films, while making visual art for exhibition. An early influence on this aspect of the scene was Alan Vega (aka Alan Suicide) whose electronic junk sculpture predated his role in the music group Suicide, which he formed with fellow musician Martin Rev in 1970. They released Suicide, their first album, in 1977.

Important exhibitions of no wave visual art were Barbara Ess's Just Another Asshole show and subsequent compilation projects and Colab's organization of The Real Estate Show, The Times Square Show, and the Island of Negative Utopia show at The Kitchen.

No wave art found an ongoing home on the Lower East Side with the establishment of ABC No Rio Gallery in 1980, and a no wave punk aesthetic was a dominant strand in the art galleries of the East Village (from 1982 to 1986).

Legacy
In a foreword to the book No Wave, Weasel Walter wrote of the movement's ongoing influence:

I began to express myself musically in a way that felt true to myself, constantly pushing the limits of idiom or genre and always screaming "Fuck You!" loudly in the process. It's how I felt then and I still feel it now. The ideals behind the (anti-) movement known as No Wave were found in many other archetypes before and just as many afterwards, but for a few years around the late 1970s, the concentration of those ideals reached a cohesive, white-hot focus.

In 2004, Scott Crary made the documentary Kill Your Idols, including such no wave bands as Suicide, Teenage Jesus and the Jerks, DNA and Glenn Branca as well as bands influenced by no wave, including Sonic Youth, Swans, Foetus and others.

In 2007–2008, three books on the scene were published: Soul Jazz's New York Noise, Marc Masters' No Wave, and Thurston Moore and Byron Coley's No Wave: Post-Punk. Underground. New York. 1976–1980.

Coleen Fitzgibbon and Alan W. Moore created a short film in 1978 (finished in 2009) of a New York City no wave concert to benefit Colab titled X Magazine Benefit, documenting performances by DNA, James Chance and the Contortions, and Boris Policeband. Shot in black and white and edited on video, the film captured the gritty look and sound of the music scene during that era. In 2013, it was exhibited at Salon 94, an art gallery in New York City.

Music compilations
 No New York (1978) Antilles, (2006) Lilith, B000B63ISE
 Just Another Asshole #5 (1981) compilation LP (CD reissue 1995 on Atavistic # ALP39CD), producers: Barbara Ess and Glenn Branca
 Noise Fest Tape (1982) TSoWC, White Columns
 Speed Trials (1984) Homestead Records HMS-011
 All Guitars (1985) Tellus Audio Cassette Magazine #10, Harvestworks
 N.Y. No Wave (2003) ZE France B00009OKOP
 New York Noise (2003) Soul Jazz B00009OYSE
 New York Noise, Vol. 2 (2006) Soul Jazz B000CHYHOG
 New York Noise, Vol. 3 (2006) Soul Jazz B000HEZ5CC

Documentary films
 Scott Crary, Kill Your Idols
 Céline Danhier, Blank City
 Coleen Fitzgibbon and Alan W. Moore, X Magazine Benefit
 Ericka Beckman, 135 Grand Street, New York, 1979

See also

Just Another Asshole
New wave music
No wave cinema
Post-punk
CBGB
Free Jazz
Brian Eno
Tier 3

References

Sources
 Berendt, Joachim E. The Jazz Book: From Ragtime to Fusion and Beyond, revised by Günther Huesmann, translated by H. and B. Bredigkeit with Dan Morgenstern. Brooklyn: Lawrence Hill Books, 1992. "The Styles of Jazz: From the Eighties to the Nineties," p. 57–59. 
 
 Moore, Alan W. "Artists' Collectives: Focus on New York, 1975–2000". In Collectivism After Modernism: The Art of Social Imagination after 1945, edited by Blake Stimson & Gregory Sholette, 203. Minneapolis: University of Minnesota Press, 2007.
 Moore, Alan W., and Marc Miller (eds.). ABC No Rio Dinero: The Story of a Lower East Side Art Gallery. New York: Collaborative Projects, 1985
 Pearlman, Alison, Unpackaging Art of the 1980s. Chicago: University of Chicago Press, 2003.
 
 Taylor, Marvin J. (ed.). The Downtown Book: The New York Art Scene, 1974–1984, foreword by Lynn Gumpert. Princeton: Princeton University Press, 2006.

External links

New York No Wave Photo Archive
Official MySpace page for Kill Your Idols, a documentary about the Cinema of Transgression & the No Wave scene
Video of Thurston Moore talking about his book "No Wave:Post-Punk. Underground. New York. 1976–1980"

 
Artscene
Industrial music
Music scenes
Performance art in New York City
Avant-garde music
Music of New York City
American rock music genres
American styles of music